Kendra Renee Wecker (born December 16, 1982 in Marysville, Kansas) is a former American professional basketball player in the WNBA.  She formerly played forward for the San Antonio Silver Stars and Washington Mystics. In the off season, she played in the Spanish league with UB F.C Barcelona.

Early and high school years
When Wecker was 10 years old, she competed in the NFL's Punt, Pass, and Kick competition, and made the finals, playing with males on an equal basis.  Wecker attended Marysville High School in Marysville, Kansas. Her team was undefeated state champions in her senior season of 2000–01. Wecker was named a WBCA All-American. She participated in the 2001 WBCA High School All-America Game, where she scored twelve points.  She also participated in track and field, representing the United States internationally, winning the gold medal at the 2000 NACAC Under-25 Championships in Athletics in the javelin throw.

College years
Wecker graduated from Kansas State University in 2005, where she was named Big 12 Conference Player of the Year in 2005.  In 2003, 2004 and 2005 she was named to the All-Big 12 First Team.  She was also named to the All-District Second Team in 2004. As a senior, Wecker was named the Lowe's Senior CLASS Award winner, recognizing her as the nation's top senior women's basketball player.

Kansas State statistics
Source

WNBA career
Wecker was drafted 4th overall by the San Antonio Silver Stars in the 1st round of the 2005 WNBA Draft. In her first game of her rookie year, she tore her ACL and was out the rest of the season.

On February 19, 2006 during the WNBA offseason, Wecker joined Tony Parker and Steve Kerr in the NBA RadioShack Shooting Stars contest. She helped achieve the NBA Shooting Stars record time of 25.1 seconds.

On May 13, 2008 she was waived by the San Antonio Silver Stars. On June 23, 2008 Wecker was signed by the Washington Mystics. On August 12, 2008 Wecker was waived by the Mystics.

Vital statistics
Position: Forward
Height: 5 ft 11 in (1.8 m)
Weight: 172 lbs
College: Kansas State University
Team(s): San Antonio Stars, Washington Mystics (WNBA)

Notes

External links
WNBA Player Profile
WNBA 2005 Draft Prospect Profile
Wecker signed by the Mystics
Mystics waived Wecker

1982 births
Living people
All-American college women's basketball players
American expatriate basketball people in Spain
American women's basketball players
Basketball players from Kansas
Kansas State Wildcats women's basketball players
People from Marysville, Kansas
San Antonio Stars players
Small forwards
Washington Mystics players